Nagyrábé is a village in Hajdú-Bihar county, in the Northern Great Plain region of eastern Hungary.

Geography

Location 
North lat 47 12.36   East long 21 19.28

References

External links

  in Hungarian
Facebook page in Hungarian
Short introduction movie from the air

Populated places in Hajdú-Bihar County